Rashid Haider (15 July 1941 – 13 October 2020) was a Bangladeshi author and novelist. He was awarded Ekushey Padak in 2014 and Bangla Academy Literary Award in 1984 by the Government of Bangladesh.  He was the author of more than 70 books throughout his career.

Background
Haider was born on 15 July 1941 at Dohapara village in Pabna in  the  then Bengal Presidency, British India. He graduated in Bangla from the University of Dhaka.

Career
Haider began journalism through the magazine Chitrali since 1961. He was a member of the Pakistan Writers' Guild in 1964. He was a member of Nagorik Natya Sampradaya, founded by his brother Zia Haider. Rashid wrote Toilo Shonkot, and acted in Baki Itihash, the first play by Nagorik.

Works

Novels
Khancay (Inside the Cage, 1975)
Nashta Josnay Ekon Aranya (What Forest is this in the Spoilt Moonlight, 1982)
Sadh Ahlad (Yearnings, 1985)
Andha Kathamala (Blind Words, 1987)
Asamabriksha (Unequal  Trees, 1987)
Mabuhai (1988)

Awards
 Ekushey Padak (2014)
 Bangla Academy Literary Award (1984)
 Nedhushah Literary Prize (1987)
 Humayun Qadir Prize (1987)
 Agrani Bank Prize  (1982)

Personal life
Haider was married to Anisa Akhter and they had two daughters. Hema& khama

References 

1941 births
2020 deaths
People from Pabna District
Bangladeshi male writers
Bengali-language writers
Recipients of Bangla Academy Award
Recipients of the Ekushey Padak
Burials at Azimpur Graveyard
Pabna Edward College alumni